Kojiro Goto (born 24 February 1962) is a Japanese equestrian. He competed in two events at the 1992 Summer Olympics.

References

External links
 

1962 births
Living people
Japanese male equestrians
Olympic equestrians of Japan
Equestrians at the 1992 Summer Olympics
Asian Games medalists in equestrian
Equestrians at the 1982 Asian Games
Equestrians at the 1986 Asian Games
Asian Games gold medalists for Japan
Asian Games silver medalists for Japan
Asian Games bronze medalists for Japan
Medalists at the 1982 Asian Games
Medalists at the 1986 Asian Games
Sportspeople from Tokyo